The Bungala Solar Power Project is a solar power farm in Emeroo and Wami Kata near Port Augusta in South Australia. The first stage was connected to the grid in May 2018, and the second stage was connected to the grid in early November 2018. The project gradually reached full power in 2020.

History
It was expected to be completed and the two stages together able to deliver 220MW of electric power to the national grid from November 2018. The completed project could contribute 220MW to the electricity grid from 275MWdc generation and expects to produce 570 GWh per year.

A professional training project is being set up to provide new skills and experience to 70 Aboriginal job seekers as part of the project. It will train them in operations and maintenance for stage 1 and construction of phase 2 of the project.

Construction
The project is being built in stages. Stages 1 and 2 will produce a combined 220MW of electricity. They were developed by Reach Energy and sold to a joint venture of Enel Green Power and Dutch Infrastructure Fund. The builder was Elecnor. Stage 3 is not scheduled to be built at this stage, but would include another 80MW of generation, and battery storage. Stage 3 was to be built if the company won a contract to supply electricity to the state government, however this contract was won by Aurora Solar Thermal Power Project. The entire output of stages 1 and 2 will be bought by Origin Energy.

Reach Energy was advised by PwC throughout the development of the project. PwC claims to have operated as a partner, taking on a share of the financial risk, rather than being paid fees for services provided. The development is on a 19th-century ostrich farm, later used for grazing sheep and cattle, and spans the boundary between the localities of Emeroo and Wami Kata. Civil engineering and construction on site was managed by Catcon. The Construction, Forestry, Mining and Energy Union accused the construction company of unsafe work practices when a construction worker was crushed by equipment on site in February 2018.

Solar panels and some of the construction materials were delivered to the site by Bowmans Rail who established a new intermodal rail terminal adjacent to the construction site on the former Leigh Creek railway line.

These related to dust during construction and ongoing contributions into the local economy once construction is complete. The state Planning Commission visited the site in July 2018.

The first supply of electricity from one section of 45MW was connected to the National Electricity Market in late May 2018. The entire first phase of the project was commissioned in September and the second phase of the Bungala Solar Project started feeding electricity into the grid at the end of October 2018. Technical issues delayed the project finish until 2020.

Size
The Bungala Solar Power Project is one of the largest solar farms in Australia. It covers 2000 acres.

References

Solar power stations in South Australia